was the second Director of Hokkaidō Agency (1888-1891). He was a veteran of the Boshin War and the Satsuma Rebellion.

People of the Boshin War
People of the Satsuma Rebellion
People from Kagoshima
Directors of the Hokkaido Agency
1837 births
1904 deaths